The 554th Electronic Systems Wing (554 ELSW) is an inactive wing of the United States Air Force.  It was last stationed at Hanscom Air Force Base, Massachusetts, where it was inactivated in 2010.

History

World War II
The wing was first activated in Northern Ireland under VII Air Force Composite Command as the 3d Combat Crew Replacement Center Group.  It used Martin B-26 Marauders and Douglas A-20 Havocs to provide combat and theater indoctrination for Eighth Air Force combat crews from November 1943 until September 1944, when the need for dedicated Army Air Forces training units in the United Kingdom was reduced.

The group's resources were used to man and equip provisional air disarmament units participating in Operation Lusty.  These units moved to France in February 1945 and advanced with Allied ground forces, seizing, securing, inventorying, and disposing of  captured Luftwaffe equipment and materiel through October 1945.  The group inactivated the following month. It was disbanded in the fall of 1948.

Support for Nellis Air Force Base and the Continental Range
The group was reconstituted as the 554th Operations Support Wing in 1980.  It provided base support functions for Nellis Air Force Base, Nevada and its associated ranges from 1980 to 1991. The wing developed, operated, and maintained all range facilities and threat simulators and provided combat support functions at Indian Springs Air Force Auxiliary Field.

Systems Management
The 554th Electronic Systems Wing was consolidated in 2006 with the Operations Support Systems Wing, which had been established in 2004 at Hanscom AFB, Massachusetts.  The wing was inactivated in June 2010.

Lineage

554th Operations Support Wing
 Constituted on 2 November 1943 as the 3d Combat Crew Replacement Center Group
 Activated on 21 November 1943
 Redesignated 3d Combat Crew Replacement Center Group (Bomber or Fighter, Special) on 17 July 1944
 Inactivated on 22 November 1945
 Disbanded on 8 October 1948
 Reconstituted on 26 February 1980 and redesignated 554th Operations Support Wing
 Activated on 1 March 1980
 Inactivated on 1 November 1991
 Consolidated on 6 April 2006 with the Operations Support Systems Wing

554th Electronic Systems Wing
 Constituted as the Operations Support Systems Wing on 23 November 2004
 Activated on 17 December 2004
 Consolidated on 6 April 2006 with the 554th Operations Support Wing
 Redesignated as the 554th Electronics Systems Wing on 17 April 2006
 Inactivated on 30 June 2010

Assignments
 VIII Air Force Composite Command, 21 November 1943
 Air Disarmament Command (Provisional), ca. 23 September 1944
 VIII Air Force Composite Command, 10 October 1944 (attached to Air Disarmament Command (Provisional) until 31 January 1945)
 IX Air Force Service Command, 1 February 1945
 1587th Quartermaster Battalion, Mobile (Aviation), 16 October 1945
 Detachment B, 9th Base Air Depot Area, 12 November 1945 - 22 November 1945
 USAF Tactical Fighter Weapons Center (later USAF Fighter Weapons Center), 1 March 1980 - 1 November 1991
 Electronic Systems Center, 17 December 2004 - 30 June 2010

Stations

 RAF Toome (AAF 236), Northern Ireland, 21 November 1943
 RAF Chipping Ongar (AAF 162), England, September 1944
 Vittel, France, by 15 March 1945
 Öhringen, Germany, by 30 April 1945
 Schwetzingen, Germany, by 1 May 1945
 Fillingen, Germany, by 15 May 1945

 Nellingen, Germany, by 31 May 1945
 Kaufbeuren, Germany (R-70), 15 October 1945
 Leipheim, Germany (R-59), ca. 31 October 1945 - 22 November 1945
 Nellis Air Force Base, Nevada, 1 March 1980 - 1 November 1991
 Hanscom Air Force Base, Massachusetts, 17 December 2004  - 30 June 2010

Components
Groups
 554th Combat Support Group, 1 March 1980 - 1 November 1991
 554th Electronic Systems Group, 17 April 2006 - 30 June 2010
 USAF Hospital, Nellis (later 554th Medical Group), 1 March 1980 - 1 November 1991
 554th Range Group, 1 March 1980 - 1 November 1991
 554th Security Police Group, 1 March 1980 - 1 November 1991
 754th Electronic Systems Group, 17 April 2006 - 30 June 2010
 2069th Communications Group (later 554th Communications Group, 554th Communications Squadron), 1 September 1990 - 1 November 1991

Operational Squadrons
 3d Replacement and Training Squadron (later 3d Replacement and Training Squadron, CCRC Group (Bombardment)), 21 November 1943 - 22 November 1945 (not operational after 10 October 1945)
 4460th Helicopter Squadron, 1 June 1985 -  31 December 1987
 Indian Springs Air Force Auxiliary Airfield, Nevada

Systems Squadrons
 Engineering and Integration Systems Squadron (later 643d Electronic Systems Squadron) 17 December 2004 - 30 June 2010
Gunter Annex, Alabama
 
Support Squadrons
 554th Combat Support Squadron, 1 March 1986 - 31 December 1987
 554th Supply Squadron, 1 March 1980 - 1 November 1991
 554th Transportation Squadron, 1 March 1980 - 1 November 1991
 Indian Springs Air Force Auxiliary Airfield, Nevada

Aircraft
 Douglas A-20 Havoc, 1944
 Martin B-26 Marauder, 1943-1944
 Fairchild AT-23, 1944
 Bell UH-1N Huey, 1985-1986

Awards and Campaigns

See also
Advanced Landing Ground

References

Notes

Bibliography

External links
Official factsheet

554